Natalia Gordienko (also spelled Gordienco; born 11 December 1987) is a Moldovan singer and dancer. Alongside Arsenium and Connect-R, she represented Moldova in the Eurovision Song Contest 2006 with the song "Loca" and placed 20th. She was selected to represent Moldova in the Eurovision Song Contest 2020 with the song "Prison"; however, the 2020 contest was cancelled due to the COVID-19 pandemic. Instead, she represented Moldova in the Eurovision Song Contest 2021 with the song "Sugar" and placed 13th with 115 points.

Life and career

Early life
Gordienko was born in Chișinău on 11 December 1987. She is of Ukrainian descent. Gordienko sang in her school choir, studied piano at music school, and danced in her school's dance ensemble for ten years. At the age of 15, she began participating in song competitions.

Music career and Eurovision
In 2005, Gordienko became the singer of the band Millennium. In 2005, in the national selection for the Calea Victoriei, Millennium came third. Millennium was invited to participate in the Golden Stag international competition in Romania in 2005.

On 20 May 2006, she represented Moldova alongside Arsenium and Connect-R with the song "Loca" at the Eurovision Song Contest 2006. The song placed 20th in the field of 24 and scored 22 points.

In 2009 Gordienko started a project called DJ Star, in which she tried herself as a DJ; she won the prize, but it was not easy, because she had no prior experience as a DJ.

In 2010, Gordienko released her first album Time and in 2011 the album Cununa de flori. However neither album was released for purchase digitally or physically. The only release it received was on Gordienko’s SoundCloud account.

In 2015, Gordienko signed her new single "Summertime" with Fly Records, the label of Tudor and Dan from Fly Project.

In 2008, Gordienko received honorary title of ″Emeritus Artist″ of Moldova.
 
She was to represent Moldova in the Eurovision Song Contest 2020 held in Rotterdam, Netherlands with the song "Prison". This would have been her second time in the contest and the first time as a solo singer, however, the 2020 contest was cancelled due to the COVID-19 pandemic. She was again selected as the Moldovan representative for the 2021 contest where she finished in 13th place with 115 points with the song “Sugar”. Her 17 second note at the end of "Sugar" was reported to be the longest note in Eurovision history.

Competitions
Gordienko has taken part in many competitions and has won many awards:
 National competition - The song on the national station Radio Moldova in 2003 - 2nd place
 National competition – The Star Of Kishinev in 2003 - grand prize
 National competition – Miss Teenager in 2004 - grand prize
 International Festival – Rainbow Stars in Jūrmala, Latvia in 2003
 International competition – Sevastopol-Ialta in Ukraine in 2004 - 1st place
 International competition – Delfice Games in 2004 - 1st place
 International competition – Heart Of Two Twins in 2004 - 1st place
 International competition – Songs Of The World in 2005 - 1st place
 International competition – Our Native Edge in 2005 - grand prize
 International competition - Eurovision Song Contest in 2006 - 20th place
 International competition - Slavianski Bazaar in 2006 - grand prize
 International competition - New Wave in 2007 - 1st place
 International competition - World Championship of performing arts in 2008 - golden medal for voice

Discography

Singles

References

External links
Natalia Gordienko on Instagram

1987 births
Living people
Eurovision Song Contest entrants of 2006
Eurovision Song Contest entrants of 2020
Eurovision Song Contest entrants of 2021
Eurovision Song Contest entrants for Moldova
21st-century Moldovan women singers
Moldovan people of Ukrainian descent
Musicians from Chișinău
New Wave winners